The Main road 311 is a north-south direction Secondary class main road in the Tápióság (Alföld) region of Hungary, that connects the Main road 31 change to the Main road 4, facilitating access from Nagykáta to Cegléd. The road is 34 km long.

The road, as well as all other main roads in Hungary, is managed and maintained by Magyar Közút, state owned company.

Sources

See also

 Roads in Hungary
 Transport in Hungary

External links

 Hungarian Public Road Non-Profit Ltd. (Magyar Közút Nonprofit Zrt.)
 National Infrastructure Developer Ltd.

Main roads in Hungary
Pest County